Arcella is a genus of testate amoebae in the Arcellinidan order.

It may also refer to:
Arcella hemisphaerica, an amoeboid species
Fabio Arcella (died 1560), Italian Roman Catholic prelate
Arcella (Padua), a district in Padua, Italy
Sanctuary of Arcella, Padua, a Roman Catholic church located in the district
San Nicola Arcella, a town and comune in Cosenza, Calabria, Italy